Tahtalı may refer to places in Turkey:

Villages 

 Tahtalı, Gönen, Balıkesir Province
 Tahtalı, Güroymak, Bitlis Province
 Tahtalı, Nilüfer, Bursa Province
 Tahtalı, Kilis, Kilis Province
 Tahtalı, Derince, Kocaeli Province
 Tahtalı, Çumra, Konya Province
 Tahtalı, Yazıhan, Malatya Province
 Tahtalı, Niksar, Tokat Province
 Another name for Çatalağzı, Zonguldak Province

Other
 Germanicopolis (Bithynia) (also known as Tahtalı), an ancient city
 Tahtalı Dağı, a mountain
 Tahtalı Mountain Range
 Tahtalı Dam

See also
 Tahtalıkaradut, Turkey
 Tahtali, Iran
 Tahtali-Jami Mosque, Crimea